Sylwester Czereszewski (born 4 October 1971 in Gołdap) is a Polish former footballer (striker, midfielder and even defender) who played for such a clubs like Stomil Olsztyn, Legia Warsaw and Lech Poznań. He finished his career playing for Odra Wodzisław Śląski in 2005. In the years 1994-1999 Czereszewski played some games for Poland national football team.

International goals

References

External links 
 

1971 births
Living people
People from Gołdap
Polish footballers
Poland international footballers
Polish expatriate footballers
OKS Stomil Olsztyn players
Legia Warsaw players
Lech Poznań players
Górnik Łęczna players
Odra Wodzisław Śląski players
Jiangsu F.C. players
Ekstraklasa players
Expatriate footballers in China
Sportspeople from Warmian-Masurian Voivodeship
Association football forwards